Rharbichthys is a genus of prehistoric fish.

References

Prehistoric aulopiformes